F-Punk is the eighth studio album by Mick Jones' post-Clash band Big Audio Dynamite, released in 1995. It was the first album to be released under the name of Big Audio Dynamite since 1989's Megatop Phoenix. The title is a pun on the funk group P-Funk, and is supposed to imply "Fuck punk." The album cover lettering takes influence from London Calling, one of Mick Jones' albums with The Clash, which in turn was a copy of Elvis Presley's debut album.

Critical reception
Trouser Press called the album "an attempt to cash in on a formidable legacy by largely abandoning dance sounds for unexceptional, straight-ahead rock — it’s emblematic of the band’s stylistic change that 'Push Those Blues Away' drops a promising jungle beat for plain-jane rock." The Hartford Courant wrote that "there's too much that sounds like demo tapes for a future album, fiddling around on keyboards, messing with volume dials, punching up experiments that don't always work." CMJ New Music Monthly thought that B.A.D. "has simply forgotten to draw the line between creative mixing and pure sludge." Entertainment Weekly wrote: "Beginning with a '1,2,3,4' count-off, the low-fi garage hum of 'I Turned Out a Punk' could act as a biography for any of the four members of the Clash."

Track listing
All songs by Mick Jones unless noted.
 "I Turned Out a Punk" - 5:24
 "Vitamin C" - 5:27
 "Psycho Wing" 7:12
 "Push Those Blues Away" (Mick Jones, Gary Stonadge) - 6:08
 "Gonna Try" - 3:55
 "It's a Jungle Out There" - 5:19
 "Got To Set Her Free" - 3:51
 "Get It All From My TV" - 4:04
 "Singapore" - 5:25
 "I Can't Go on Like This" (Mick Jones, Lauren Jones) - 5:54
 "What About Love?" / "Suffragette City" (hidden track) (David Bowie) - 9:44 total

There is also a hidden track 3:47 into "I Turned Out a Punk".

Personnel

Big Audio Dynamite
 Mick Jones - guitar, vocals, producer
 Nick Hawkins - guitar, vocals
 André Shapps - keyboards, producer
 Gary Stonadge - bass, vocals
 Chris Kavanagh - drums, vocals
 Micky Custance - DJ, percussion, vocals

Others
 Henery Glover - engineer
 Jason Eyers - engineer
 Tim Burrell - mastering

References

External links
 Article about B.A.D. and partially F-Punk

1995 albums
Big Audio Dynamite albums